State Route 231 (SR 231) is a  long state highway in the U.S. state of Washington serving communities in Lincoln and Stevens counties. The highway, located entirely west of Spokane in the Inland Empire, serves Sprague, Edwall, Reardan, Springdale and Chewelah.

Although SR 231 was established in 1964, the US 2 concurrency has existed as  since 1909. Later, Secondary State Highway 2G (SSH 2G) and Secondary State Highway 3J (SSH 3J) were established in 1937 and formed SR 231 in 1964. The highway crosses the Spokane River on the Spokane River Bridge at Long Lake Dam, which was constructed in 1949 and added to the National Register of Historic Places in 1995 before repair work in late 2008.

Route description

SR 23 is the "parent" or main route of SR 231 and travels northwest to Harrington and south to Downtown Sprague, spanning ,  shorter than SR 231. Traveling northeast, the highway traverses a hill and cliff, passing Browns Lake, and turns west. The direction of the roadway becomes north through a narrow valley and SR 231 arrives in Edwall as Oregon Street. The roadway briefly turns east as Main Street before crossing a BNSF Railway line and continuing northeast alongside the tracks.

Becoming concurrent with US 2, the road becomes Broadway Street and enters Reardan. SR 231 turns north at Aspen Street and crosses the Eastern Washington Gateway Railroad and a marsh via a causeway. As Spring Creek Road, the highway travels northwest parallel to Spring Creek into Spring Creek Canyon. After the canyon, the roadway crosses the Spokane River on the Spokane River Bridge at Long Lake Dam, the border between Lincoln and Stevens counties, west of Little Falls Dam and Long Lake. Nearly a mile north of the bridge, SR 231 intersects , a connector to Spokane. After the intersection, the highway travels north through the community of Ford and continues through a valley into Springdale. Within Springdale, the roadway is named Second Street and intersects , which connects east to US 395 near Loon Lake. After crossing a BNSF Railway track, Second Street turns west as Shaffer Street and passes the Springdale Community Health Center, the local medical clinic. SR 231 crosses Sheep Creek and the same railway as Second Street and leaves Springdale, parallel to the railroad, into a valley.

History

SR 231 was established in 1964, but sections of the current route have been in the state highway system as early as 1909, when  was established and included a section near Reardan. In 1913, the Inland Empire Highway was established and connected Loon Lake to Springdale and Chewelah. A county-maintained road connected Sprague to Browns Lake by 1919 and in 1923, State Road 7 became  and the Inland Empire Highway became . State Road 2 became  (PSH 2) in 1937 and a secondary route, Secondary State Highway 2G (SSH 2G) was created, extending from Sprague to Reardan, in 1937. State Road 3 became  during the same year and a secondary route, SSH 3J, was also established to span from the Little Falls Dam at Long Lake to Springdale.

Three years later, in 1949, the Spokane River Bridge at Long Lake Dam was constructed and spanned from the southern terminus of SSH 3J to Lincoln County. In 1957, PSH 3 and US 395 were moved to an eastern route bypassing Springdale, while SSH 3J was extended north towards Chewelah and a branch of the highway was added to Loon Lake, both along the former route of PSH 3. SSH 3J was extended south to PSH 2 and US 2 in Reardan, east of the northern terminus of SSH 2G, in 1963. During the 1964 highway renumbering, SR 231 was created from SSH 2G and SSH 3J and became concurrent with US 2; US 2 replaced PSH 2 and US 395 replaced PSH 3, while the branch of SSH 3J to Loon Lake became . The Spokane River Bridge was added to the National Register of Historic Places on June 2, 1995 along with the rest of the bridges on the Spokane River northwest of Spokane, and the bridge was repaired in late 2008. In the 1990s, the state proposed a jurisdictional transfer with Lincoln County to decommission the Sprague–Reardan section of SR 231. The highway was later used to haul uranium waste by truck following attempts by WSDOT to force the contractor to fund safety improvements on its haul route.

Major intersections

References

Further reading

External links

Highways of Washington State

231
Transportation in Lincoln County, Washington
Transportation in Stevens County, Washington